= Kopparavandlapalle =

Kopparavandlapalle is a village of nearly 130 houses near the city of Tirupathi in Andhra Pradesh, India. The village includes three temples dedicated to the gods Gurrappa, Gangamma and Srirama.
